María Schutzmeier (born 29 October 1999) is a Nicaraguan swimmer. She competed in the women's 100 metre freestyle at the 2019 World Aquatics Championships held in Gwangju, South Korea. In 2021, she competed in the women's 100 metre freestyle event at the 2020 Summer Olympics held in Tokyo, Japan.

References

External links
 

1999 births
Living people
Nicaraguan female swimmers
Place of birth missing (living people)
Swimmers at the 2019 Pan American Games
Nicaraguan female freestyle swimmers
Pan American Games competitors for Nicaragua
Swimmers at the 2020 Summer Olympics
Olympic swimmers of Nicaragua
20th-century Nicaraguan women
21st-century Nicaraguan women